Assara funerella is a species of snout moth in the genus Assara. It was described by Ragonot in 1901. It is found in Taiwan, Japan (Hokkaido, Honshu), China and Korea.

The wingspan is 12–13 mm for males and  16–18 mm for females. The forewings are pale brown, broadly suffused with ashy white. The hindwings are brownish white, but darker apically.

The larvae feed on Pinus thunbergii.

References

Moths described in 1901
Phycitini
Moths of Asia